The Pearlers is a 1949 documentary film from director Lee Robinson about the pearling industry off the coast of Broome. Robinson later used a similar background for his feature King of the Coral Sea (1954).

The film was released to cinemas as a support feature, which was not common at the time, and has since come to be regarded as a minor classic of Australian documentary filmmaking.

References

External links
The Pearlers at IMDb

The Pearlers at National Film and Sound Archive
The Pearlers at Ozmovies

Australian documentary films
1949 films
Pearls
1949 documentary films
Australian black-and-white films